Teaching to See is a 2012 educational documentary film about graphic design and teaching of Inge Druckrey and some of her students and colleagues. Directed by Andrei Severny and produced by Edward Tufte, it was released in July 2012 and was screened in New York, Boston, Phoenix, Toronto, Reykjavík, Philadelphia, Stanford, and New Haven.

The film covers various topics and principles of seeing, analyzing and executing. It provides insights into graphic design, typography, composition, form and visual arts education.

In 2012 Matthew Carter wrote about the film: "This film is about patient and dedicated teaching, about learning to look and visualize in order to design, about the importance of drawing. It is one designer’s personal experience of issues that face all designers, expressed with sympathy and encouragement, and illustrated with examples of Inge Druckrey’s own work and that of grateful generations of her students. There are simple phrases that give insights into complex matters, for example that letterforms are 'memories of motion.' Above all, it is characteristic of Inge that in this examination of basic principles the word beautiful is used several times."

Interviewees

 Inge Druckrey
 Kris Holmes
 Ken Carbone
 Chris Myers
 Nancy Mayer
 Nora Hillman Goeler

Critical reception
FastCompany writer Kyle Vanhemert claimed "the film opens the eyes to the design details around you." In her article "Learn to See Like an Artist" at Lifehacker Melanie Pinola called it a "beautifully made film." She wrote "Whether you're an aspiring artist or not, the video can teach you how to really look, notice and appreciate design details, and become more critical and curious in the process." Sean Blanda at Behance 99U wrote "watch the first five minutes and you’ll be hooked."

References

External links
 
 
Perceiving Deeply, review of the documentary Teaching to See by Jan Almquist at The Design Observer (July 2014)
Inge Druckrey interview on documentary Teaching to See at RÚV, The Icelandic National Broadcasting Service
Daring Fireball on Teaching to See documentary
Teaching to See featured by Grafill - Norwegian Organisation for Visual Communication
MBL.is article on "Teaching to See" titled "What's the Secret to creativity?"

2012 films
2012 documentary films
American documentary films
American independent films
Films directed by Andrei Severny (filmmaker)
Typography
Documentary films about the visual arts
History of printing
2010s English-language films
2010s American films